Extermineitors IV: Como hermanos gemelos (English language title: Exterminators 4: As Twin Brothers) is a 1992 Argentine comedy action film directed by Carlos Galettini and starring Guillermo Francella and Aldo Barbero. The central argument of the film is largely a parody-homage of the classic Schwarzenegger/DeVito comedy Twins. It premiered on 23 January 1992 in Buenos Aires.

Synopsis 
The leader of the Extermineitors task force, Colonel William, has discovered that the old enemy of the organization, Mc Clain, has left crime and lives quietly in Iguazu Falls. William wants Mc Clain to work for him and on the right side of the law. He develops a plan for his top man, Guillermo, to perform the mission of recruiting Mc Clain, by making him believe that Mc Clain is his long lost twin brother. From then on, Guillermo, and Mc Clain become friends and fight together against the old criminal organization of ninja robbers, now leadered by the vicious criminal known as The Albino.

Cast 
 Guillermo Francella ... Guillermo
 Aldo Barbero ... Colonel William
 Rand McClain ... Randolf Mc Clain (as Randolf Mc Clain)
 Javier Belgeri ... Nico
 Mike Kirton ... The Albino
 Verónica Varano ... Ana
 Marcela Labarca
 Charlie Nieto
 Jorge Montejo ... Paolo el Rockero
 Ricky Maravilla ... Himself
 Oscar Roy
 Alejandra Pradon
 Poupee Pradon
 Jorge Rial
 Valeria Britos ... Sol

References

External links 
 

Argentine action comedy films
1992 films
1990s Spanish-language films
1992 action comedy films
Films directed by Carlos Galettini
1990s Argentine films